Diego Alan del Real Galindo (born 6 March 1994) is a Mexican hammer thrower.

He competed in boys' hammer throw at the 2010 Summer Youth Olympics, finishing first in the B final and then 4th at the 2016 Summer Olympics.

Personal life
Diego Alan Del Real Galindo was born in Monterrey, Nuevo León, Mexico. He is also known as "El Gato", since he was a kid, this nicknames were given to him the first time his parents saw all his potential.  He studied at Universidad Autónoma de Nuevo León.

One of the greatest hammer throw athletes of Mexico, with just 19 years old, Diego Alan Del Real Galindo already has experience on national and international competitions like Pan American Games of Guadalajara, with a Silver medal on Jr. Pan American Championship Miramar 2011, Gold Medal on Centro American Hammer Throw competition, Gold Medal on San Salvador 2012, Silver Medal on Centro American and Caribbean of Morelia 2013 and he finished first, winning the gold medal at the 2013 Pan-American Games in Colombia.

He is coached by Alejandro Laverdesque.

Personal best

Achievements

1No mark in the final

References

External links

 All Athletics  for Diego del Real Galindo
 Atleta Nuevo Leon for Diego del Real Galindo
Tilastopaja biography

1994 births
Living people
Mexican male hammer throwers
Sportspeople from Monterrey
Athletes (track and field) at the 2010 Summer Youth Olympics
Athletes (track and field) at the 2011 Pan American Games
Athletes (track and field) at the 2015 Pan American Games
Athletes (track and field) at the 2019 Pan American Games
Athletes (track and field) at the 2016 Summer Olympics
Olympic athletes of Mexico
Central American and Caribbean Games gold medalists for Mexico
Competitors at the 2014 Central American and Caribbean Games
Competitors at the 2018 Central American and Caribbean Games
World Athletics Championships athletes for Mexico
Pan American Games competitors for Mexico
Competitors at the 2017 Summer Universiade
Central American and Caribbean Games medalists in athletics
Athletes (track and field) at the 2020 Summer Olympics
21st-century Mexican people